Annensky Most is a rural locality (a selo) in Kemskoye Rural Settlement, Vytegorsky District, Vologda Oblast, Russia. The population was 2,166 as of 2002. There are 32 streets.

Geography 
Annensky Most is located 62 km southeast of Vytegra (the district's administrative centre) by road. Artyukovo is the nearest rural locality.

References 

Rural localities in Vytegorsky District
Vytegorsky Uyezd